Rombach is a small town in the commune of Rambrouch, in western Luxembourg.  , the town had a population of 231.

Rambrouch
Towns in Luxembourg